Tricorynus is a genus of death-watch and spider beetles in the family Ptinidae.

These 92 species belong to the genus Tricorynus:

 Tricorynus major (LeConte, 1878) i c g
 Tricorynus abbreviatus White, 1965 i c g
 Tricorynus abdominalis White, 1965 i c g
 Tricorynus aberrans White, 1965 i c g
 Tricorynus abnormis White, 1965 i c g
 Tricorynus abruptus (Fall, 1905) i c g
 Tricorynus angustus White, 1965 i c g
 Tricorynus arizonicus (LeConte, 1878) i c g
 Tricorynus auctus White, 1965 i c g b
 Tricorynus bifoveatus (LeConte, 1865) i c g
 Tricorynus borealis White, 1965 i c g
 Tricorynus californicus (Fall, 1905) i c g
 Tricorynus carinatus (Hamilton, 1893) i c g
 Tricorynus castaneus (Fall, 1905) i c g
 Tricorynus cicatricosus White, 1965 i c g
 Tricorynus coactus (Fall, 1905) i c g
 Tricorynus confusus (Fall, 1905) i c g b
 Tricorynus congruus (Fall, 1905) i c g
 Tricorynus conjunctus (Fall, 1905) i c g
 Tricorynus conophilus (Fall, 1905) i c g
 Tricorynus consobrinus Ford, 1998 i c g
 Tricorynus cryptoglyptus (LeConte, 1878) i c
 Tricorynus debilis (Fall, 1905) i c g
 Tricorynus densus (Fall, 1905) i c g b
 Tricorynus dichrous (Fall, 1905) i c g
 Tricorynus dispar White, 1981 i c g
 Tricorynus dudleyae White, 1965 i c g
 Tricorynus elutus (Horn, 1894) i c g b
 Tricorynus estriatus (Fall, 1905) i c g
 Tricorynus exiguus White, 1965 i c g
 Tricorynus extremus (Pic, 1905) i c
 Tricorynus falli (Fall, 1905) i c g b
 Tricorynus fastigiatus (Pic, 1912) i c g
 Tricorynus floridanus (Fall, 1905) i c g
 Tricorynus gibbulus Pic, 1905 g
 Tricorynus goyasensis (Fall, 1905) i c g
 Tricorynus gracilis (LeConte, 1858) i c g b
 Tricorynus gravis White, 1965 i c g
 Tricorynus guttiformis (Gorham, 1883) i c g
 Tricorynus herbarius White, 1965 i c g
 Tricorynus imitans (Fall, 1905) i c g
 Tricorynus inaequalis (Fall, 1905) i c g
 Tricorynus indistinctus White, 1965 i c g
 Tricorynus inflatus White, 1965 i c g
 Tricorynus lanceolatus (Horn, 1894) i c g
 Tricorynus latus (Fall, 1905) i c g
 Tricorynus lentus White, 1965 g
 Tricorynus lepesmei White, 1965 i c g b
 Tricorynus lucidus (Fall, 1901) i c g
 Tricorynus luteotectus Pic, 1928 g
 Tricorynus mancus (Fall, 1905) i c g
 Tricorynus megalops White, 1965 i c g
 Tricorynus meieri (Reitter, 1897) g
 Tricorynus moderatus White, 1965 i c g
 Tricorynus mutans (Fall, 1905) i c g
 Tricorynus nigripennis (Fall, 1905) i c g
 Tricorynus nigritulus (LeConte, 1865) i c g
 Tricorynus nubilus (Fall, 1905) i c g
 Tricorynus obliteratus White, 1965 i c g
 Tricorynus obscurus White, 1965 i c g
 Tricorynus obsoletus (LeConte, 1865) i c g
 Tricorynus palliatus (Fall, 1901) i c g b
 Tricorynus parvus (Fall, 1905) i c g
 Tricorynus pierrei (Lepesme, 1947) g
 Tricorynus pinguis (Fall, 1905) i c g
 Tricorynus platyops White, 1965 i c g
 Tricorynus politus (Fall, 1905) i c g
 Tricorynus porosus (Fall, 1905) i c g
 Tricorynus posticus (Fall, 1905) i c g
 Tricorynus productus White, 1965 i c g
 Tricorynus punctatus (LeConte, 1865) i c g b
 Tricorynus punctulatus (LeConte, 1878) i c g
 Tricorynus pusillus (LeConte, 1858) i c g
 Tricorynus reiteri Pic, 1927 g
 Tricorynus robustus (Horn, 1894) i c g
 Tricorynus rotundus (White, 1960) i c g
 Tricorynus sallei (Guérin-Méneville, 1851) g
 Tricorynus sharpi (Pic, 1912) i c g
 Tricorynus similis (LeConte, 1878) i c g b
 Tricorynus tabaci (Guérin-Méneville, 1850) i c g
 Tricorynus texanus White, 1965 i c g b
 Tricorynus tibialis White, 1965 i c g
 Tricorynus tropicus White, 1965 i c g
 Tricorynus tumidus (Fall, 1905) i c g
 Tricorynus turbidus (Fall, 1905) i c g
 Tricorynus uniformis (Fall, 1905) i c g
 Tricorynus vacuus (Fall, 1905) i c g
 Tricorynus validus (Fall, 1905) i c g
 Tricorynus ventralis (LeConte, 1865) i c g
 Tricorynus vestitus (Fall, 1905) i c g
 Tricorynus vitiosus (Fall, 1905) i c g
 Tricorynus vittatus White, 1965 i c g

Data sources: i = ITIS, c = Catalogue of Life, g = GBIF, b = Bugguide.net

References

Ptinidae